Humber River—Black Creek is a federal electoral district in Toronto, Ontario, Canada, that has been represented in the House of Commons of Canada from 1867 to 1904 and since 1917. Prior to the 2015 election, the riding was known as York West. The former name reflects the riding is in the former Township of York which is within the City of Toronto.

As per the 2016 Census, Humber River—Black Creek is the City of Toronto riding with the highest percentage of people belonging to the Latin American (9.5%) and Southeast Asian (8.9%) communities. It is also the City of Toronto riding with the highest percentage of people of Jamaican (8.5%) and Vietnamese (8.0%) ethnic origins. At the same time, it is one of only two (2) City of Toronto ridings (besides Etobicoke Centre), where Italian is the largest ethnic community (12.8%).

Geography
The district includes the northwest corner of the former city of North York. It includes the neighbourhoods of Humber Summit, Humbermede, Humberlea, York University Heights, Jane and Finch and the extreme western part of Downsview.

It consists of the part of the City of Toronto bounded on the north by the northern city limit, and on the east, south and west by a line drawn from the city limit south along Keele Street, west along Grandravine Drive, southeast along Black Creek, west along Sheppard Avenue West, south along Jane Street, west along Highway 401, and northwest along the Humber River to the northern city limit.

Demographics

''According to the Canada 2021 Census; 2013 representation

Languages: 44.3% English, 7% Spanish, 6.1% Vietnamese, 5.8% Italian, 3.9% Tagalog, 2.1% Urdu, 1.8% Punjabi, 1.6% Yue, 1.4% Tamil, 1.2% Portuguese, 1.1% Assyrian Neo-Aramaic, 1.1% Gujarati
Religions: 58.9% Christian (32.6% Catholic, 3.4% Pentecostal, 1.7% Christian Orthodox, 1% Anglican), 15.2% No religion, 10.5% Muslim, 7.1% Hindu, 6.1% Buddhist, 1.7% Sikh 
Median income (2020): $31,400 
Average income (2020): $37,240

Ethnicity groups: Black: 24.6%, White: 21.4%, South Asian: 13.8%, Southeast Asian 10.2%, Latin American: 9%, Chinese: 2.4%, Arab: 1.7%, West Asian: 1.7%

Ethnic origins: Italian 10.2%, Vietnamese 8.1%, Filipino: 7.3%, Indian 5.9%, Jamaican 5.3%, Canadian 5.2%, African 4.6%, Chinese 4%, Guyanese 2.5%, Pakistani 2.3%

Member of Parliament
The riding is represented by Judy Sgro in the House of Commons of Canada.

History
It was created by the British North America Act which divided the County of York into two ridings: York East and York West.

The West Riding of York consisted of the Townships of Etobicoke, Vaughan and that part of the Township of York lying west of Yonge Street.

In 1874, it was expanded to include all of the Village of Richmond Hill, which had previously been divided between the two York ridings, after the village council had petitioned to have the whole village included in York West.

The electoral district was abolished in 1903 when York was divided into three ridings. York West was redistributed between the new ridings of York Centre and York South.

The riding was re-created in 1914 from parts of York Centre and York South when the county of York, including parts of the city of Toronto, was divided into four ridings: York North, South, East and West. West York was defined to consist of the townships of Vaughan and Etobicoke and the villages of Weston, New Toronto, Mimico and Woodbridge and Ward 7 of the city of Toronto; and the portion of the township of York lying between the western limit of the city of Toronto and the township of Etobicoke bounded on the south by Lake Ontario and on the north by Northland Avenue.

In 1924, it was redefined to consist of the part of the county of York lying west of Yonge Street, south of the south boundary of the township of Vaughan and outside the city of Toronto.

In 1933, it was redefined to consist of the part of the Township of York lying west of a line drawn north from the limits of the city of Toronto along Weston Road and west along Lambton Avenue to the Humber River, the Township of Etobicoke, the towns of Mimico and New Toronto and the villages of Long Branch and Swansea.

In 1952, it was redefined to consist of the town of New Toronto, the village of Long Branch and the part of the township of Etobicoke lying west of a line drawn from the southwest corner of the town of Mimico north along the west boundary of the town of Mimico, east along Queen Elizabeth Way, north along Royal York Road, east along Sunnydale Drive, north along Prince Edward Drive, east along Bloor Street West and Old Mill Road, north along the Humber River, to the northern boundary of the township of Etobicoke.

In 1966, it was redefined to consist of the part of Metropolitan Toronto bounded by a line drawn from Eglinton Avenue West, north along Jane Street, east along Lawrence Avenue West, north along the C.N.R. line, west along Highway 401, north along Keele Street, west along Calvington Drive, northwest along Exbury Road, north along Jane Street, west along Sheppard Avenue West, north along Highway 400, west along Steeles Avenue West, south along the boundary between the Townships of Etobicoke and Toronto, southeast along the West Branch of the Humber River, south along Kipling Avenue North, east along Rexdale Boulevard, south along Islington Avenue North, east along Dixon Side Road, southeast along the Humber River, and east Eglinton Avenue West to Jane Street.

In 1976, it was redefined to consist of the part of Metropolitan Toronto bounded on the north by Steeles Avenue West, on the west by the Humber River, and on the south and east by a line drawn from the Humber River east along Lawrence Avenue West, north along Keele Street, west along Sheppard Avenue West, and north along Highway No. 400 to Steeles Avenue West.

In 1987, it was redefined to consist of the parts of the cities of Etobicoke and North York bounded on the north by Steeles Avenue West, and on the west, south and east by a line drawn from Steeles Avenue south along Martin Grove Road, southeast along Albion Road, north along Kipling Avenue, southeast along Farr Avenue, east to Islington Avenue, north along Islington Avenue, south along the western limit of the City of North York, east along Highway 401, north along Jane Street, east along Grandravine Drive, and north along Black Creek to Steeles Avenue.

In 1996, it was redefined to consist of the part of the City of North York bounded on the north and west by the city limits, and on the east and south by a line drawn from Steeles Avenue south along Dufferin Street, west along Sheppard Avenue West, north along Keele Street, west along Grandravine Drive, south along Jane Street, and west along Highway 401 to the western city limit.

In 2003, it was given its current boundaries as described above.

Members of Parliament

This riding has elected the following Members of Parliament:

Former boundaries

Election results

Humber River—Black Creek, 2015-present

York West, 1917–2015

	

					

Note: Conservative vote is compared to the total of the Canadian Alliance vote and Progressive Conservative vote in 2000 election.
					
					

	
Note: Canadian Alliance vote is compared to the Reform vote in 1997 election.

	

					

	
					
	

	
			

	

	

					

	
			
					

	
				
					

	
1 Movement for an Independent Socialist Canada	
					
					

	
				
				

	
					
				

	

					

	
				
		

	
Note: NDP vote is compared to CCF vote in 1958 election.

					

	
					
				

	

		
				
	

	
				
					

	
					
				

	
Note: Progressive Conservative vote is compared to "National Government" vote in 1940 election.

					

	
Note: "National Government" vote is compared to Conservative vote in 1935 election.

	

	
					
					

	
Note: popular vote compared to vote in 1926 election.
	

				

		
				
					

	
					

	
Note: Conservative vote is compared to Government vote in 1917 election, and Liberal vote is compared to Opposition vote.

York West, 1867–1904

	
					

	
					

	

	

	
Note: popular vote compared to vote in 1891 general election.

		
			
Resigned to accept appointment as Controller of Customs but re-offered

See also
 List of Canadian federal electoral districts
 Past Canadian electoral districts

References

Notes

External links
Riding history 1867-1903 from the Library of Parliament
Riding history 1914-2008 from the Library of Parliament
 2011 results from Elections Canada
 2011 Results from Elections Canada
 Campaign expense data from Elections Canada

Federal electoral districts of Toronto
Ontario federal electoral districts
1867 establishments in Ontario
1903 disestablishments in Ontario
1914 establishments in Ontario